James Abercrombie was an inventor born on July 7, 1891 and died on January 7, 1975. He was best known for designing the world’s first reliable  blowout preventer (BOP) to contain disastrous well blowouts. Abercrombie was inducted into the Hall of Fame in 2020.

References

1891 births
1975 deaths
20th-century American inventors